Neeugoa is a monotypic moth genus of the family Erebidae. Its only species, Neeugoa kanshireiensis, is found in Taiwan. Both the genus and species were first described by Wileman and South in 1916.

References

Calpinae
Monotypic moth genera